Lev Korolyov is the name of:

 Lev Nikolayevich Korolyov (1926–2016), Russian computer scientist
 Lev Vladimirovich Korolyov (born 1986), Russian footballer

See also
Korolyov (disambiguation)